Kök-Tash is a village in the Batken Region of Kyrgyzstan, just east of the border with Tajikistan. It is part of the Leylek District. Its population was 3,957 in 2021.

The town of Andarak is 7 miles (12 km) to the northeast.

References

Populated places in Batken Region